Novela or Novelas may refer to:

Geography
Novelas, in Penafiel, a parish in Portugal; see List of parishes of Portugal: P
Port-la-Nouvelle, Narbonne, Aude, France; a commune

Literature
Novel genre in Spain and Latin America
Novelas ejemplares of Cervantes
Novella, a short novel

Film and TV
Telenovela, genre in Latin America
Novela TV, Polish TV
Novela de un joven pobre, 1968 film

Music

Albums
Novela, album by Tony Malaby, and Kris Davis
La Novela, album by Akwid, 2008 
Novelas, album by Os Paralamas do Sucesso, 2010
Novelas, album by Rita Lee, 2002
Novelas, album by Gal Costa, 2005
Novelas, album by Marina Lima, 2007 
Novelas, album by Caetano Veloso
Novelas, album by Djavan, 2001
Novelas, album by Marina Elali
Novelas, album by Martinho da Vila, 2006

See also
 Novel (disambiguation)